N'Djamena is the capital and largest city of Chad. It is also a special statute region, divided into 10 districts or arrondissements.

The city serves as the centre of economic activity in Chad. Meat, fish and cotton processing are the chief industries, and it is a regional market for livestock, salt, dates, and grains. 

It is a port city located at the confluence of the Logone River with the Chari River, forming a transborder agglomeration with the city of Kousséri (in Cameroon), capital of the Department of Logone-et-Chari, which is on the west bank of both rivers. In 2014, it had 1,093,492 inhabitants.

History 

N'Djamena was founded as Fort-Lamy by French commander Émile Gentil on 29 May 1900, and named after Amédée-François Lamy, an army officer who had been killed in the Battle of Kousséri about a month earlier. It was a major trading city and became the capital of the region and nation.

During the Second World War, the French relied upon the city's airport to move troops and supplies. On 21 January 1942, a lone German He 111 of the Sonderkommando Blaich successfully bombed the airfield at Fort-Lamy, destroying oil supplies and ten aircraft. Fort-Lamy received its first bank branch in 1950, when the Bank of West Africa (BAO) opened a branch there.

On 6 April 1973, President François Tombalbaye changed its name to N'Djamena (taken from the Arabic name of a nearby village, Niǧāmīnā, meaning "place of rest") as part of his authenticité program of Africanization. The city was occupied by Libya during the 1980–81 Libyan intervention as part of the Chadian–Libyan conflict, and the associated Transitional Government of National Unity.

The city was partly destroyed during the Chadian Civil War, in 1979 and again in 1980. In these years, almost all of the population fled the town, searching for refuge on the opposite bank of the Chari River in Cameroon, next to the city of Kousseri. The residents did not return until 1981–82, after the end of the clashes. Until 1984, facilities and services were subject to strict rationing, and schools remained closed.

The period of turmoil in the city was started by the abortive coup attempted by the northerner Prime Minister Hissène Habré against the southerner President Félix Malloum: while Malloum and the national army loyal to him were defeated, the intervention in the battle of other northern factions rival to that of Habré complicated the situation. A temporary truce was reached in 1979 through international mediation, establishing the warlord Goukouni Oueddei as head of a government of national unity with his rival Habré as Defense Minister. The intense rivalry between Goukouni and Habré caused the eruption of new clashes in the city in 1980; N'Djamena found itself divided into sectors controlled by the various warlords. The tug-of-war reached a conclusion after many months only when Goukouni asked for the intervention of the Libyans, whose tanks overwhelmed Habré's defenses in the capital.

Following differences between Goukouni and Muammar Gaddafi and international disapproval of Libyan intervention, the Libyan troops left the capital and Chad in 1981. This opened the door to Habré, who marched on N'Djamena, occupying the city with little resistance in 1982 and installing himself as the new president. He was eventually dislodged in a similar fashion in 1990 by a former general of his, Idriss Déby,  the head of state of Chad.

The city had only 9,976 inhabitants in 1937, but a decade later, in 1947, the population had almost doubled to 18,435. In 1968, after independence, the population reached 126,483. In 1993, it surpassed half a million with 529,555. A good deal of this growth has been due to refugees fleeing into N'Djamena for security, although many people fled N'Djamena, also depending on the political situation. The city surpassed the million mark in population by the early 2010s.

On 13 April 2006, a rebel United Front for Democratic Change attack on the city was defeated in the Battle of N'Djamena.  The city was once again attacked on 2 February 2008, by UFDD and RFC rebels. (See Battle of N'Djamena (2008))

Geography 

While primarily an administrative centre, the city includes the Nassara Strip commercial centre and residential areas, such as Mbololo, Chagoua, Paris Congo and Moursal. The main commercial avenue of the city is the Avenue Charles de Gaulle.

Environment 
N'Djamena is Africa's most polluted city.

Climate
N'Djamena has a hot semi-arid climate (Köppen BSh) with a short wet season and a lengthy dry season. The wet season lasts from June to September, with the heaviest rain occurring in August. The dry season essentially covers the remaining eight months. Based on annual temperatures, N'Djamena is one of the hottest major cities on the planet. In only one month of the year (August) do average monthly high temperatures fail to cross the  mark. The city's highest temperatures are usually seen between March and May, just before the onset of the heavier rains.

Economy 

N'Djamena's primary economic source is agricultural work. About 80% of the population within N'Djamena works within farming-based industries, including cultivation of crops and growing livestock. The economy in N'Djamena is therefore almost totally reliant on good weather, making the economy struggle in years with low rainfall. N'Djamena receives financial aid from the World Bank, as well as the African Development Bank. There is a high demand for skilled laborers within N'Djamena to work for oil and gas sectors, as well as laborers for foreign non-governmental organizations, medical services, and English teaching. Residents of N'Djamena are liable to pay tax up to a maximum amount of 60% of all net income.

Culture 

Attractions in the city include the Chad National Museum, the Al-Mouna Cultural Center, Our Lady of Peace Cathedral, and several mosques. Within the Chad National Museum, one can view the partial skull of the Sahelanthropus, called by locals as "Toumaï". This skull was discovered in the northern part of Chad and is considered to be from one of the earliest human ancestors. Views of sunset across the Chari River can also be spectacular. N’Djamena was named Capital of Islamic Culture in 2009.

Education 

In N'Djamena, education can be thought of as a luxury even though it is compulsory and free and has been since Chad's independence in 1960. Not more than forty percent of elementary age children in Chad have an opportunity to attend classes and with N'Djamena's poor state stability it is even harder for children to get an education. After progressing through elementary school, some students go on to a university. N’Djamena has two universities: the University of N’Djamena with French as the language of instruction, built in 1971; and King Faisal University - Chad with Arabic as the language of instruction, built in 1991. Secondary schools include the long established Lycée Félix Éboué and Lycée technique commercial, the Lycée Montaigne de N'Djamena (French international school). Secondary school within Chad is mandatory, however only 68% of students over the age of 12 attend school. Of that 68%, 70% of these students attend school within N'Djamena. Many of the students in international schools are children of executives, diplomats, and non-governmental organization employees.

Places of worship    

Among the places of worship, they are predominantly Muslim mosques.   There are also Christian churches and temples: Roman Catholic Archdiocese of N'Djamena (Catholic Church), Evangelical Church of Chad, Christian Assemblies in Chad (Plymouth Brethren).

Government 

N’Djamena is the home of the National Assembly of Chad, along with many political organisations and parties, and every national ministry. The Supreme Court and Court of Appeal are also in N’Djamena, along with every major embassy in Chad, including the French and US embassies. It is sometimes considered within the region of Chari-Baguirmi, although separate.

Transport

Road

The city is the eastern terminus of the Trans-Sahelian Highway, and is linked to East Africa by the (largely unpaved) N’Djamena–Djibouti Highway. The Tripoli-Cape Town Highway also passes through N’Djamena, making it a key Central African location in the Trans-African Highway network. N’Djamena is linked by road bridge to Kousseri in Cameroon.

Airport
N’Djamena International Airport Hassan Djamous (IATA code NDJ) is located on the outskirts of the city.

River travel
Historically, N’Djamena's main link to the exterior was by river boat up the Chari and Logone rivers, but these now carry little trade.

Railway
The city has no railway links. However, railways have been proposed.

Twin cities
 Toulouse, France; since 1980
 Stupino, Russia; since 2000

Notes

References

Citations

Sources

External links 

 Map of N'Djamena
 Best travel guide
 earth-info.nga.mil

 
Capitals in Africa
Populated places in Chad
Populated places established in 1900
Logone River
French Equatorial Africa
Cameroon–Chad border crossings
Regions of Chad